Gravis may refer to:

Advanced Gravis Computer Technology, manufacturer of computer peripherals, soundcards and joysticks
Dynamic Sport Gravis, a Polish paraglider design
Gravis, an alien in the Doctor Who story Frontios
Myasthenia gravis, a long-term neuromuscular disease